Osborne Joseph "Ormsby" Roy (February 25, 1905 – March 8, 1959) was an American Negro league infielder between 1929 and 1932.

A native of Pittsburgh, Pennsylvania, Roy played for the Homestead Grays in 1929. He played for Homestead again in 1932, and also played for the Pittsburgh Crawfords that season. Roy died in Pittsburgh in 1959 at age 54.

References

External links
 and Seamheads

1905 births
1959 deaths
Homestead Grays players
Pittsburgh Crawfords players
Baseball infielders
Baseball players from Pittsburgh
20th-century African-American sportspeople